Open ModelSphere is a data, process and UML modeling tool written in Java and distributed as free software under the GPL License. It provides support for forward and reverse engineering between UML and relational schemas.

History
Open ModelSphere has SILVERRUN PerfectO for an ancestor, proprietary software developed by Computer Systems Advisers and released in 1996. PerfectO was part of the SILVERRUN suite of modeling tools, known in the modeling community since the 1990s; PerfectO was used to support object-oriented modeling (limited to class modeling at that time) and object-relational modeling.

In 1998, PerfectO was translated into Java resulting in SILVERRUN-JD (Java Designer). With the addition of relational data modeling, the product was renamed to SILVERRUN ModelSphere and released in 2002.  Later on, more features were added including support for business process modeling, conceptual data modeling, and UML diagramming.

In September 2008, Grandite released ModelSphere's core application as an open source product based on the GNU Public License version 3. Its development environment was hosted on JavaForge which shut down March 31, 2016. An empty project is hosted on SourceForge which was registered on Sep 16th, 2008 and last updated on Mar 27th, 2013. No releases, files, or source code are available on the SourceForge project page as of Oct 18th, 2016.

Database support
Open ModelSphere works with

 Oracle
 Informix
 Microsoft SQL Server
 Sybase
 DB2
 PostgreSQL

Releases

January 6, 2016:  Open ModelSphere 3.2.2
 No release notes provided

November 2009: Open ModelSphere 3.1, featuring
 Core application based on Java 6
 New look & feel
 Interface to forward / reverse engineer Java code
 New mechanism to facilitate the use of plug-ins

September 2008: Open ModelSphere 3.0
 First open source release

July 2002: SILVERRUN ModelSphere 2.0
 Addition of business process modeling

February 2002: SILVERRUN ModelSphere 1.0
 Addition of relational modeling

See also
List of UML tools
Entity-relationship model

References

External links
 

Free UML tools
Diagramming software